Eeva Kuusela née Saarinen (born June 12, 1984 in Keuruu, Finland) is a female breaststroke swimmer from Finland. She competed for her native country at the 2004 Summer Olympics in Athens, Greece.

References
Eeva Kuusela at SportElite's website 
sports-reference

1984 births
Living people
People from Keuruu
Finnish female breaststroke swimmers
Swimmers at the 2004 Summer Olympics
Olympic swimmers of Finland
Sportspeople from Central Finland